Longthorpe Tower is a 14th-century three-storey tower in the village of Longthorpe, famous for its well-preserved set of medieval murals.

Details
Longthorpe tower is located in the village of Longthorpe, now a residential area of Peterborough in the United Kingdom, about two miles (3 km) to the west of the city centre. At the start of the 14th century, Robert Thorpe built the tower as an extension to an existing fortified manor house.

Thorpe had worked his way to relative wealth through the local Peterborough Abbey, and the tower may have been something of a status symbol.

The tower has three stories, and the first floor was originally designed as living space for Thorpe.

The tower is best known for its English medieval wall paintings, carried out around 1330. The paintings show religious, secular and moral themes and the quality is comparatively good for a provincial work. The paintings were whitewashed over around the time of the Reformation and remained hidden until their rediscovery in the 1940s. Historian Clive Rouse considers that "no comparable scheme...of such completeness and of such early date exists in England".

The property is now owned by English Heritage and is a Grade I listed building and a Scheduled Monument protected by law.

See also
 Castles in Great Britain and Ireland
 List of castles in England
 Thorpe Hall

References

Bibliography
Emery, Anthony. (2006) Greater Medieval Houses of England and Wales, 1300–1500: Southern England. Cambridge: Cambridge University Press. .
Pettifer, Adrian. (2002) English Castles: a Guide by Counties. Woodbridge, UK: Boydell Press. .
Pounds, Norman John Greville. (1994) The Medieval Castle in England and Wales: a social and political history. Cambridge: Cambridge University Press. .

Further reading

Books

Salter, Mike, 2001, The Castles of East Anglia (Malvern) p. 21
Taylor, Alison, 1986, Castles of Cambridgeshire (Cambridge)
King, D.J.C., 1983, Castellarium Anglicanum (London: Kraus) Vol. 2 pp. 319–20
Fry, P.S., 1980, Castles of the British Isles (David and Charles) p. 256
Pevsner, Nikolaus, 1961, Buildings of England: Northamptonshire (Penguin) pp. 284–5
Downman, E.A., 1906, in Serjeantson, R.M., Ryland, W. and Adkins, D. (eds), VCH Northampton Vol. 2 pp. 456–7, 459
Turner, T. H., 1851, Some account of Domestic Architecture in England (Oxford) Vol. 1 p. 153

Journal articles
Casagrande, Gino and Kleinhenz, Christopher, 1985, 'Literary and Philosophical Perspectives on the Wheel of the Five Senses in Longthorpe Tower' Traditio Vol. 41 p. 311-27
[Fletcher], 1969, Medieval Archaeology Vol. 13 p. 273
Rouse, E.Clive and Baker, Audley, 1955, 'The wall-paintings at Longthorpe Tower' Archaeologia Vol. 96 pp. 1–57
Country Life Vol. 101 p. 604
Yun, Bee, 2007, 'A Visual Mirror of Princes: The Wheel on the Mural of Longthorpe Tower' Journal of the Warburg and Courtauld Institutes Vol. 70 pp. 1–32

Guidebooks
2001, Longthorpe Tower Cambridgeshire (English Heritage)
Rouse, E.Clive, 1949 and 1987, Longthorpe Tower (HMSO)

External links
English Heritage site

Towers in Cambridgeshire
Buildings and structures in Peterborough
Country houses in Cambridgeshire
English Heritage sites in Cambridgeshire
Scheduled monuments in Cambridgeshire
Grade I listed buildings in Peterborough
Grade I listed buildings in Cambridgeshire